K. Kader Masthan is a  Sri Lankan politician and a member of the Sri Lankan parliament from Vanni Electoral District as a member of the [[Sri Lanka Podujana Peramuna] and [State Minister of Rural Economy]].

References

Sri Lanka Podujana Peramuna politicians
Living people
Members of the 16th Parliament of Sri Lanka
Members of the 15th Parliament of Sri Lanka
Year of birth missing (living people)